Charles Alexis Nove (born 29 June 1960 in London, England) is a British radio broadcaster who currently presents the weekday breakfast show for classical music station Scala Radio.

Biography

Early career
The son of Soviet historian Alexander Nove, his earliest presentational experience was at Glasgow's Hospital Broadcasting Service in 1976. From 1981 he was a member of BBC Radio 2's continuity team and, in common with many of the station's announcers and newsreaders, he had many stints presenting the station's overnight and early morning output, culminating as regular host of the weekend overnight show for several years until 1998. Nove has in the past served as a co-presenter and announcer on the original Come Dancing and announcer again for the gameshow Wipeout in the 1990s. In 1991 he commentated for BBC One on the Lord Mayor's Show. He has also served as a BBC1 continuity announcer and, apart from his association with Radio 2, has presented radio programmes on Jazz FM, Magic FM and many others.

For several years, he was also the presenter of the EuroMix in-flight audio entertainment channel, exclusive to Emirates, showcasing artists such as Regy Clasen and Paola e Chiara. Long-haul passengers on BMI flights are guided through a special in-flight Yoga session presented by Nove on their Relaxation Channel. Between 1995 and 2016, Nove was also the official stand in for regular National Lottery announcer Alan Dedicoat.

Later career
In recent years he has provided holiday relief for Radio 2 and what used to be Saga Radio in Scotland, and following John Marsh's semi retirement in February 2007 he became one of the regular newsreaders on the flagship breakfast show Wake Up to Wogan until the end of its run in December 2009, Nove sharing a birthday with one of the show's other newsreaders, Fran Godfrey. He continued to read news on Radio 2 until his final bulletin on 8 September 2012. He was also the London studio technical operator when Terry Wogan presented his Radio 2 show from various locations around Europe during coverage of the Eurovision Song Contest and other outside broadcasts in the United Kingdom.

Nove is the co-owner of an AEC Routemaster bus, with Ken Bruce, Alan Dedicoat, Steve Madden and David Sheppard. On the Wogan show Nove was well known for his impersonation of Cyril "Blakey" Blake, the inspector from the 1970s television sitcom On the Buses.

Charles Nove founded the A1 VOX audio recording studios in London in 1999 and remains the company's Managing Director.

From May 2011 Charles Nove was a presenter on BBC Radio Oxford, where, until 2016, he presented the religious programme on Sundays between 6 and 9am in addition to the Early Breakfast sequence on certain weekdays.  Between March 2015 and December 2018 he presented Early Breakfast Monday to Friday between 6 and 7am, and was then a contributor to the main Breakfast Show.

Nove is the subject of Half Man Half Biscuit's "Nove on the Sly", a track from their 2000 album Trouble over Bridgwater.

Nove is also a narrator for Toby Groom's YouTube channel Epic History TV which began on 10 March 2015.

Nove became a BBC Radio 4 continuity announcer in August 2018 until March 2019, when he began presenting the weekday breakfast show on Scala Radio.

References

External links
 A biography
 Charles Nove's website
  Charles Nove's blog
 Charles Nove on Scala Radio
 Screen Time with Charles Nove on Scala Radio

BBC newsreaders and journalists
British male journalists
British radio personalities
British people of Russian-Jewish descent
Living people
Radio and television announcers
1960 births
BBC Radio 2 presenters
BBC Radio Scotland presenters